İzocam is a Turkish insulation material manufacturer.

History

Izocam was founded in 1965 as the first producer of Fibreglass insulation material in Turkey, and began production in Gebze, just east of Istanbul, in 1967. Since the 1990s Izocam has produced glass wool in Tarsus, Mersin and mineral wool in the Gebze plant. Both materials are produced under license from French manufacturer Isover Saint-Gobain, as well as expanded polystyrene boards under license from the Owens Corning Corporation. Finally in 2000 Izocam began producing flexible rubber insulation materials in Eskişehir, under the license from Armacell GmbH.

References

External links
The company homepage

Manufacturing companies of Turkey
Turkish companies established in 1965
Manufacturing companies established in 1965